Pouteria nudipetala is a species of plant in the family Sapotaceae. It is found in Brazil and Peru.

References

nudipetala
Vulnerable plants
Taxonomy articles created by Polbot